48/49 is the debut album from German hardcore punk band, Beatsteaks. It was released in February, 1997. The band signed with Epitaph Records for their next release, Launched, in 2000.

Track listing

Credits
Arnim Teutoburg-Weiß	–	vocals, guitar
Peter Baumann	–	guitar
Bernd Kurtzke	–	guitar
Alexander Roßwaag	–	bass
Stefan Hircher	–	drums

References

1997 debut albums
Beatsteaks albums